Miss International 1988, the 28th Miss International pageant, was held on July 17, 1988 in Gifu, Japan and hosted by Masumi Okada. Catherine Alexandra Gude of Norway was crowned at the end of the event.

Results

Placements

Contestants

  - Adriana Patricia Almada
  - Toni-Jene Frances Peters
  - Alexandra Elisabeth Winkler
  - Sonia Montero
  - Elizabeth Ferreira da Silva
  - Heather Jane Daniels
  - Katherine Stayshyn
  - Adriana Maria Escobar Mejía
  - Erika Maria Paoli González
  - Tina Maria Jorgensen
  - Sari Susanna Pääkkönen
  - Nathalie Marquay
  - Christiane Kopp
  - Vasiliki Gerothodorou
  - Liza Maria Camacho
  - Ellis Adriaensen
  - Ericka Aguilera Garay
  - Betsy Cheung Fung-Ni
  - Gudbjörg Gissurardóttir
  - Shikha Swaroop
  - Karin May O'Reilly
  - Galit Aharoni
  - Fabiola Rizzi
  - Michelle Samantha Williams
  - Yuki Egami
  - Lee Yoon-hee
  - Isabelle Seara
  - María Alejandra Merino Ferrer
  - Nicky Lisa Gillett
  - Gloria Patricia Propst
  - Catherine Alexandra Gude
  - Xelmira del Carmen Tristán
  - Susan Maria León Carassa
  - Maria Anthea "Thea" Oreta Robles
  - Maria Helena Raposo Canelas
  - Yolanda Martínez
  - Angeline Lip Lai Fong
  - Maria Carmen Aragall Casadellá
  - Ulrika Helena Westergren
  - Corine Wittwer
  - Passorn Boonyakiat
  - Didem Fatma Aksel
  - Gisel Silva Sienra
  - Dana Michelle Richmond
  - Maria Eugenia Duarte
  - Alma Hasanbasic

Notes

Did not compete
  - Barbara Brigitta Tiefenbacher
  - Nyai Iroh Nureneh

References

External links
 Pageantopolis - Miss International 1988

1988
1988 in Japan
1988 beauty pageants
Beauty pageants in Japan